is a Japanese politician of the Liberal Democratic Party, a member of the House of Councillors in the Diet (national legislature). A native of Suginami, Tokyo and graduate of the University of Tokyo, he worked the Ministry of Construction from 1967 until 1997. In 1998, he was elected to the House of Councillors for the first time.

References

External links 
 Official website in Japanese.

Members of the House of Councillors (Japan)
1945 births
People from Suginami
Living people
Liberal Democratic Party (Japan) politicians